Mount Coree (formerly known as Pabral) is a mountain with an elevation of   that is located within the Brindabella Range on the border between the Australian Capital Territory and New South Wales, Australia. The summit of the mountain is located in the Australian Capital Territory.

Location and features
The mountain is situated in the Brindabella National Park on the NSW side and in the Namadgi National Park on the ACT side.

Before European settlement, the mountain was used by Indigenous Australian tribes to hunt for bogong moths. Coree is an aboriginal name for moth. Mount Coree was originally shown as "Pabral" on an 1834 map of Major Sir Thomas Mitchell, an Australian colonial explorer.

See also

List of mountains of Australia

References

External links 
Photo of the lookout operator on Mount Coree, January 2003

Coree
Coree
Borders of the Australian Capital Territory
Borders of New South Wales
Coree
Yass Valley Council